Thorkild may refer to:

Thorkild Fjeldsted (1740–1796), Icelandic lawyer, Prime Minister of the Faroe Islands from 1769 to 1772
Thorkild Grosbøll (1948–2020), parish priest in the Church of Denmark
Thorkild Hansen (1927–1989), Danish novelist known for his Slave Trilogy
Thorkild Jacobsen (1904–1993), renowned historian specialising in Assyriology and Sumerian literature
Thorkild Roose (1874 – 1961), Danish actor and theatre director
Niels Thorkild Rovsing (1862–1927), Danish surgeon remembered for describing Rovsing's sign
Thorkild Simonsen (1926–2022), Danish politician and member of the Social Democrats
Svenn Thorkild Stray or Svenn Stray (1922–2012), Norwegian politician, foreign minister of Norway
Thorkild Thyrring (born 1946), Danish auto racing driver

See also
Thorkildsen
Torkild
Torkildsen
Thorkel
Torkil

Masculine given names
Danish masculine given names
Norwegian masculine given names
Scandinavian masculine given names